Events from the year 1688 in China.

Incumbents 
 Kangxi Emperor (27th year)

Events 
 Sino-Russian border conflicts
 The Tong of Fushun, originally Han Bannermen, begin reinventing themselves as Manchu

Births
 Yunti, Prince Xun (10 February 1688 – 16 February 1755), born Yinzhen and also known as Yinti before 1722, formally known as Prince Xun, was a Manchu prince and military general of the Qing dynasty

Deaths
 Empress Xiaozhuangwen (28 March 1613 – 27 January 1688), of the Khorchin Mongol Borjigit clan, personal name Bumbutai, was a consort of Hong Taiji. She was 21 years his junior.

References

 
 .

 
China